The Independent Record (often abbreviated to IR) is a daily newspaper printed and distributed in Helena, Montana. The newspaper is part of the Lee Enterprises group.

History 

The roots of the IR lie in two newspapers that were founded in 1867, The Daily Herald of Helena and The Weekly Independent of Deer Lodge. 

The Daily Herald started publishing in Helena on August 2, 1867. The Weekly Independent started publishing in Deer Lodge on October 12, 1867, and then moved to Helena in March 1874, and began publication as The Daily Independent, and then, in 1875, as The Helena Independent. 

The Herald later merged with The Montana Daily Record, which was founded in August 1900. The new publication was renamed The Montana Record-Herald. Additionally, on November 22, 1943, another merger followed: this time with The Helena Independent, to become the Independent Record.

After over thirty years of ownership by the Anaconda Copper Mining Company, the IR was sold to Lee Enterprises in 1959. The IR converted from hot metal to phototype in 1973, and in 1975, installed one of the first newsroom computer systems. In the summer of 2002, a new press plant was opened and housed in a new  printing and distribution center.

See also
Montana Free Press, an investigative journalism organization based in Helena, Montana

References

External links
 
 

Newspapers published in Montana
Lee Enterprises publications
Helena, Montana
1867 establishments in Montana Territory
Daily newspapers published in the United States
Newspapers established in 1867